Soul Junction is an album by jazz pianist Red Garland, released in 1960 on Prestige Records. It features tracks recorded on November 15, 1957, the same day the pieces for All Mornin' Long were recorded, with the same lineup.

Track listing 
"Soul Junction" (Garland) – 15:30
"Woody 'n' You" (Dizzy Gillespie) – 6:50
"Birks' Works" (Dizzy Gillespie) – 7:35
"I've Got It Bad (And That Ain't Good)" (Duke Ellington, Paul Francis Webster) – 6:15
"Hallelujah" (Vincent Youmans) – 6:31

Personnel 
 Red Garland – piano
 John Coltrane – tenor sax
 Donald Byrd – trumpet
 George Joyner – bass
 Art Taylor – drums

References 

1960 albums
Albums produced by Bob Weinstock
Prestige Records albums
Red Garland albums